Nao Kamea (born 6 May 1982) is a Papua New Guinean woman cricketer. She played for Papua New Guinea at the 2008 Women's Cricket World Cup Qualifier.

References

External links 

1982 births
Living people
Papua New Guinean women cricketers